Bruce Mines/Kerr Field Aerodrome  is a private aerodrome located  east northeast of Bruce Mines, Ontario, Canada. It is operated by Dan and Pat Kerr.

References

Registered aerodromes in Algoma District